Iryna Petrenko, née Iryna Varvynets (Ukrainian: Ірина Варвинець; born 4 July 1992, in Mokhnatyn, Chernihiv Oblast, Ukraine) is a Ukrainian biathlete. She is World Championships medalist. She participated at 2018 Winter Olympics.

Career
Her first international competition was 2009 Junior World Championships in Canmore, Canada. Her best achievement was just 27th in sprint. Next year she also competed only at junior-level competitions. For the first time, she participated in IBU Cup race in season 2010-11. She was 16th and 17th in sprints in Beitostolen, Norway. Later Varvynets had good results in Junior Worlds and Europeans, where she had 4 Top-10 finishes in 6 races and won a silver medal in relay. Next year she improved her performance and won four medals at Junior World and European championships. Two more relay medals came in season 2012-13. She also participated at 2013 Winter Universide in Italian Trentino, winning there silver and bronze medals.

She debuted for the Ukrainian team at the World Cup on 16 January 2014, in the women's sprint in Antholz-Anterselva, Italy, where she was 61st. Following that World Cup stage 2014 in Nové Město wasn't very successful.

In 2014-15 season, she had some good results in IBU Cup, so she got a spot in the women's national team. She participated in the women's relay in Oberhof, Germany. Varvynets was appointed as finisher. She made two additional shots and had good chances to win a medal, but due to her low speed, Ukraine finished just 6th. Nevertheless, she had good personal results, regularly finishing in the points zone and once having a Top-10 finish. So she was included in the team roster for 2015 World championships in Kontiolahti, Finland.

On 17 January 2016, she had her first relay victory in Ruhpolding, Germany. Later that year, Iryna participated at 2016 World Championships in Oslo, Norway, where her best finish was 9th in individual race. Since then, she has been a permanent member of the Ukrainian national team.

Varvynets won a silver medal in relay at 2017 World Championships in Austrian Hochfilzen. But she participated only in one personal race - individual - placing 20th.

She qualified to represent Ukraine at the 2018 Winter Olympics. She was 73rd in sprint and competed in both relays.

Performances

Winter Olympics

World Championships

World Cup

Relay podiums

Rankings

IBU Cup

Individual podiums

Relay podiums

References

External links
Biathlon.com.ua
IBU Datacenter

1992 births
Living people
Ukrainian female biathletes
Olympic biathletes of Ukraine
Biathletes at the 2018 Winter Olympics
Biathletes at the 2022 Winter Olympics
Biathlon World Championships medalists
Universiade medalists in biathlon
Universiade silver medalists for Ukraine
Universiade bronze medalists for Ukraine
Competitors at the 2013 Winter Universiade
Sportspeople from Chernihiv Oblast
21st-century Ukrainian women